The Malaysian Houses of Parliament (Malay: Bangunan Parlimen Malaysia), is a building complex where the Malaysian Parliament assembles. The structure is located at the Lake Gardens in Kuala Lumpur, close to the Malaysian National Monument.

Description
The complex comprises two parts, a 3-story main building and a 17-story 77 metre tall tower. The main building hosts the Dewan Rakyat (House of Representatives) and the Dewan Negara (Senate) while representatives' offices are located in the tower.

The complex was constructed during the period when the federal government was based in Kuala Lumpur. While the vast majority of government operations has moved to Putrajaya since the late-1990s, the parliament continues to convene at Kuala Lumpur's Parliament House.

Construction
Tunku Abdul Rahman, the first Malayan Prime Minister, suggested the construction of the Houses of Parliament in December 1959. The construction of the building cost RM18 million. Designed by Ivor Shipley, a British architect in the Public Works Department, the construction commenced in September 1962, and the opening of the new Parliament building was officiated by Tuanku Syed Putra ibni Almarhum Syed Hassan Jamalullail, the third Yang di-Pertuan Agong, on 21 November 1963. Tunku Abdul Rahman's statue was erected near the Parliament Square on 1971. The statue was designed by an American sculptor, Felix de Weldon who also designed the Malaysian National Monument.

In culture
The buildings have only weakly represented Malaysian government to the world, but are symbolic as that in Malaysia. The building has also been prominently featured on reverse of the first series sen coins and the first and second series M$1,000 banknotes.

See also 
Perdana Putra, federal government administrative building in Putrajaya

External links
Official Parliament Malaysia website

References

Buildings and structures in Kuala Lumpur
Parliament of Malaysia
Legislatures of Malaysia
Government buildings in Malaysia
Government buildings completed in 1963
Modernist architecture in Malaysia